Guillaume Durand may refer to:

Guillaume Durand (c. 1230–1296), French canonist and liturgical writer, and Bishop of Mende
Guillaume Durand (journalist) (born 1952), French journalist
Guillaume Durand (nephew) (died 1328 or 1330), French clergyman

See also
Durand (surname)